Itambacuri is a Brazilian municipality located in the state of Minas Gerais.  its population is estimated to be 23,209. Itambacuri contains its own airport, referred to as the 'Itambacuri airport'.

Notable people
 

Camila Alves (born 1983), model, designer, and wife of actor Matthew McConaughey
Breno Coelho (born 1980), photographer/cinematographer

References

Municipalities in Minas Gerais